Harry Flaherty may refer to:
 Harry Flaherty (tight end) (born 1989), American football tight end
 Harry Flaherty (linebacker) (born 1961), American football linebacker